Robert David Reed (born October 9, 1956 in Omaha, Nebraska) is a Hugo Award-winning American science fiction author.  He has a Bachelor of Science in Biology from the Nebraska Wesleyan University.  Reed is an "extraordinarily prolific" genre short-fiction writer with "Alone" being his 200th professional sale. His work regularly appears in Asimov's, Fantasy & Science Fiction, and Sci Fiction.  He has also published eleven novels.
, Reed lived in Lincoln, Nebraska with his wife and daughter.

Awards
 "Mudpuppies" (1986) (First Writers of the Future Grand Prize winner)
 la Voie terrestre (1994), the French translation of Down the Bright Way (1991) (Grand Prix de l'Imaginaire for foreign novel)
 "Decency" (1996) (Asimov's Science Fiction reader poll, short story)
 "Marrow" (1997) (Science Fiction Age reader poll, novella)
 "She Sees My Monsters Now" (2002) (Asimov's Science Fiction reader poll, short story)
 "A Billion Eves" (2006): Hugo Award for Best Novella, 2007

He was nominated for the John W. Campbell Award for Best New Writer in Science Fiction in 1987.

Bibliography

Marrow Series
 Marrow (2000)
 The Well of Stars (2004)
 The Greatship (2013) (collection)
 The Memory of Sky (2014)
 The Dragons of Marrow (2018)

Novels
 The Leeshore (1987)
 The Hormone Jungle (1987)
 Black milk (1989)
 Down the Bright Way (1991). Review by Jo Walton.
 The Remarkables (1992)
 Beyond the Veil of Stars (1994)
 An Exaltation of Larks (1995)
 Beneath the Gated Sky (1997)
 Sister Alice (2003)

Collections
 The Dragons of Springplace (1999)
 Chrysalide (2002) (French-language translations)
 The Cuckoo's Boys (2005)

Chapbooks
 Mere (2004) (Set in the world of the Great Ship/Marrow)
 Flavors of My Genius (2006)

Stories

Nonfiction
 "Read This" in The New York Review of Science Fiction, July 1992.
 "Improbable Journeys" (2004), the afterword to Mere, which detailed the development of the stories set in the Marrow universe.
 "Afterword" to The Cuckoo's Boys, a short fiction collection.

References
Sites of more general interest that were used as references are listed in the "External links" section.
 
 The Locus Index to Science Fiction
 Robert Reed at The Locus Index to Science Fiction Awards
 Hugo Awards 2007 at the World Science Fiction Society's official Hugo Awards site
 The Theodore Sturgeon Memorial Award official page at the website of the Center for the Study of Science Fiction

Notes

External links
 
 Robert Reed's online fiction
 Fantastic Fiction Author Page
 April 1998 interview in Locus
 October 2003 interview  in Science Fiction Weekly
 Nebraska Center for Writers
 Story behind Marrow — Online Essay at Upcoming4.me

1956 births
Living people
20th-century American novelists
21st-century American novelists
American alternate history writers
American fantasy writers
American male novelists
American male short story writers
American science fiction writers
Asimov's Science Fiction people
Hugo Award-winning writers
The Magazine of Fantasy & Science Fiction people
Nebraska Wesleyan University alumni
Writers from Lincoln, Nebraska
20th-century American short story writers
21st-century American short story writers
20th-century American male writers
21st-century American male writers